Darkowski Glacier is a glacier in the Cathedral Rocks, flowing north between Zoller Glacier and Bol Glacier into the Ferrar Glacier of Victoria Land. It was charted by the British Antarctic Expedition, 1910–13, under Robert Falcon Scott, and named by the Advisory Committee on Antarctic Names in 1964 for Lieutenant Leon S. Darkowski, U.S. Navy, chaplain in 1957 at the Naval Air Facility on McMurdo Sound.

References
 

Glaciers of Victoria Land
Scott Coast